Gurazala is a town in Palnadu district in the Indian state of Andhra Pradesh. It is the headquarters of Gurazala mandal , Gurazala Assembly constituency and Gurazala revenue division. It was formed as a municipality combining two Panchayat's of Gurazala-Jangamaheswarapuram in 2020 by the government of Andhra Pradesh. The town has a history over 800+ years in the historical palnadu times(11th century) and served as the headquarters/capital of the region during that time.

History 
The battle of Palnadu took place between Gurazala and Macherla between 1176 AD – 1182 AD at Karampudi (Yuddabhoomi). Gurazala is capital of palnadu kingdom. This is one of the historical places in Andhra pradesh.

Geography 

Governance 

Gurazala nagar panchayat is the municipal body of the town.

Notable people 

 Nayakuralu Nagamma, minister of the Gurajala faction who led the army against Macherla faction in the Battle of Palnadu,
 Kaneganti Hanumanthu, started the Palnadu Rebellion against taxes.

 Palnati Bramhanaidu, Minister of Palnadu Kingdom and a great social reformer of medieval india.
 Kavuri Venkaiah, a freedom fighter, started training institutes for teachers and free education for many poor people around the Palnadu area.

Education 

The village had 25 schools in 2018–2019, including one each of government, model, KGBV and state welfare residential schools; 11 private and 10 Zilla/Mandal Parishad schools. Jagarlamudi Zilla Parishad High School is a district council funded school, which provides secondary education in the village.

References 

Villages in Palnadu district